The Twenty-third Amendment may refer to the:
Twenty-third Amendment of the Constitution of Ireland, which permitted the state to recognise the International Criminal Court
Twenty-third Amendment to the Constitution of Pakistan, which granted legal cover to military courts
Twenty-third Amendment to the United States Constitution, which allowed residents of the District of Columbia to vote in presidential elections